Crisis n.T.i. was the music project of United Kingdom-based composer Ged Denton, known for his work in The Cyber-Tec Project. Under the moniker Denton released the album The Alien Conspiracy for Fifth Colvmn Records in 1995.

History
Crisis n.T.i. was founded in 1995 out of Cumbria as a solo outlet for composer Ged Denton's compositions. That year Genton released The Alien Conspiracy on Fifth Colvmn Records. The album combines EBM with dark ambient and industrial programming. The music's concept is about the media's coverage of close encounters. Crisis n.T.i.'s debut was reissued by Fifth Colvmn Records on October 17, 1995.

Discography
Studio albums
 The Alien Conspiracy (1995, Fifth Colvmn)

Compilation appearances
 Cyber-Tec America (1995, Invisible)
 Fuckin' Hardfloor Volumes 1+2 (1995, Atomic)
 Sound-Line Vol. 3 (1996, Side-Line)
 Untitled (1996, Infected/Cyber-Tec)
 Neurostyle Vol. IV (1996, Neuro Style)
 Sacrilege: A Tribute to Front 242 (1999, Cleopatra)

References

External links 
 
 
 

Musical groups established in 1995
Musical groups established in 1999
1995 establishments in the United Kingdom
1998 establishments in the United Kingdom
Ambient musicians
English electronic musicians
English industrial musicians
Electronic body music musicians
Fifth Colvmn Records artists